Rohnerville may refer to:
Rohnerville, California
Rohnerville Airport
Rohnerville Rancheria